Biberbrugg is a village in the canton of Schwyz in Switzerland. Biberbrugg is shared by the municipalities of Einsiedeln in the district of Einsiedeln and Feusisberg in the district of Höfe.

History 
For centuries, the village was a small hamlet with a bridge crossing the Biber river, just upstream of its confluence with the Alp river.

In 1877, a train station of the railway line Wädenswil–Einsiedeln was built. Fourteen years later, the Südostbahn (SOB) established the line St. Gallen–Schwyz, and Biberbrugg became an important railway node. Around the train station, a settlement in the municipality Einsiedeln was established on the southern side of the Biber river. Later, the motorway St. Gallen–Rapperswil–Schwyz–Ingenbohl on the western side of the river was built; this part of the village belongs to the municipality of Feusisberg.

Transport 
Biberbrugg is a nodal point of the Südostbahn's Voralpen Express and of the motorway between St. Gallen and Schwyz. The village's railway station is also a stop of the Zürich S-Bahn on the lines S13 to Wädenswil and S40 to Rapperswil.

References

External links 

 

Villages in the canton of Schwyz